Metallata absumens, the variable metallata moth, is a species of moth in the family Erebidae. It is found in North America.

The MONA or Hodges number for Metallata absumens is 8573.

Subspecies
These two subspecies belong to the species Metallata absumens:
 Metallata absumens absumens
 Metallata absumens contiguata Hayes, 1975

References

Further reading

 
 
 

Eulepidotinae
Articles created by Qbugbot
Moths described in 1862